The First Geography Congress, which was held in Ankara in 1941, separated Turkey into seven geographical regions, which are still used today.

The congress took numerous factors into consideration when defining these regions, including the fact that Turkey is surrounded by sea on three sides and the presence of mountain ranges lying parallel to the length of the coastline that isolate the central section from the influence of the sea.  Based on these factors and the resulting differences in the climate, natural plant cover and the distribution of types of agriculture, as well as the influences of these on the transportation systems and types of housing, the congress divided Turkey into four coastal and three central regions.

The coastal regions were named after the seas to which they are adjacent (the Black Sea, the Marmara, the Aegean and the Mediterranean Regions). The central regions were named according to their location in the whole of Anatolia (Central, Eastern and Southeastern Anatolia Regions).

References

External links
Turkish Geographical Society's official website
Turkish Geographical Society's official website 

Geography conferences
Geography of Turkey
1941 in Turkey
Regions of Turkey
1941 in science
1941 conferences